The 2007 Swiss Figure Skating Championships (officially named  and ) were held in Genève from December 7 through 9th, 2006. Medals were awarded in the disciplines of men's singles, ladies' singles, pair skating, and ice dancing.

Senior results

Men

Ladies

Ice dancing

Junior results

Pairs

Ice dancing

External links
 The 2007 Swiss Figure Skating Championships

Swiss Figure Skating Championships
Swiss Figure Skating Championships, 2007